Nicolaea is a Neotropical genus of butterfly in the family Lycaenidae.

Species
Nicolaea cauter (Druce, 1907)
Nicolaea schausa (E. D. Jones, 1912)
Nicolaea dolium (Druce, 1907)
Nicolaea ceglusa (Hewitson, 1868)
Nicolaea bagrada (Hewitson, 1868)
Nicolaea xorema (Schaus, 1902)
Nicolaea fabulla (Hewitson, 1868)
Nicolaea demilineata (Lathy, 1936)
Nicolaea obelus (Druce, 1907)
Nicolaea castinotus (Johnson & Le Crom, 1997)
Nicolaea cupa (Druce, 1907)
Nicolaea petilla (Hewitson, 1868)
Nicolaea velina (Hewitson, 1868)
Nicolaea torris (Druce, 1907)
Nicolaea besidia (Hewitson, 1868)
Nicolaea socia (Hewitson, 1868)
Nicolaea viceta (Hewitson, 1868)
Nicolaea opalia (Hewitson, 1868)
Nicolaea opaliana (Hayward, 1967)
Nicolaea ophia (Hewitson, 1868)
Nicolaea heraldica (Dyar, 1914)
Nicolaea pyxis (Johnson, 1993)
Nicolaea umuarama (Johnson, 1993)
Nicolaea laconia (Hewitson, 1868)
Nicolaea lemuria (Hewitson, 1868)
Nicolaea munditia (Druce, 1907)

References

Eumaeini
Lycaenidae of South America
Lycaenidae genera